Harlands Creek is a  long 3rd order tributary to the Rocky River in Chatham County, North Carolina.  This is the only stream of this name in the United States.

Variant names
According to the Geographic Names Information System, it has also been known historically as:
Hollands Creek

Course
Harlands Creek rises about 1.5 miles west of Gum Springs, North Carolina in Chatham County and then flows south to join the Rocky River about 5 miles southwest of Pittsboro.

Watershed
Harlands Creek drains  of area, receives about 47.4 in/year of precipitation, and has a wetness index of 431.04 and is about 77% forested.

References

Rivers of North Carolina
Rivers of Chatham County, North Carolina